The following is a list of weapons used by the Provisional Irish Republican Army during The Troubles.

Sources
 

During the initial phase of The Troubles (1969-1972), the Provisional IRA was poorly equipped and primarily used weapons from World War II. Beginning in the 1970s, the Provisional IRA began importing modern weapons from supporters in the Republic of Ireland, the United States, Libyan leader Colonel Muammar Gaddafi, and arms dealers in Europe, the Middle East, and elsewhere.

Firearms

Explosives

Grenade launchers

Anti-tank weapons

Anti-aircraft weapons

Flamethrowers

Mortars

See also

 Improvised tactical vehicles of the Provisional IRA

References

Bibliography
 
 

Provisional Irish Republican Army weapons
Provisional Irish Republican Army